Zeniel Co, Ltd. (Hangul:제니엘) was one of Korea's first outsourcing companies for corporate  services. The company operates a human resources media portal for companies and for jobseekers.

Zeniel is headquartered in Seocho-dong Seocho-gu Seoul, Korea. It began in 1990 and was incorporated in 1996.  The company's chairman is Bak In Joo (박인주).

See also
Contemporary culture of South Korea

References

External links
Zeniel Homepage (in Korean)

Service companies of South Korea
Business services companies established in 1990
South Korean companies established in 1990
Companies based in Seoul
Employment agencies
Internet properties established in 1990